I Keep Comin' Back! (subtitled Sonny Stitt on the Varitone) is an album by saxophonist Sonny Stitt recorded in 1966 and released on the Roulette label. The album represents Stitt's second album featuring the varitone, an electronic amplification device which altered the saxophone's sound.

Reception

Allmusic awarded the album 3 stars.

Track listing 
 "I Keep Coming Back for More" (Quincy Jones, Eddie Barclay,  Johnny Lehmann) - 2:13   
 "Manhattan Fever" (Henry Glover, Morris Levy) - 2:19   
 "I Will Wait for You" (Michel Legrand) - 2:05   
 "Lullabye of Birdland" (George Shearing) - 4:21   
 "Swingin' Shepherd Blues" (Moe Koffman) –  2:40   
 "Quintessence" (Jones) - 3:59   
 "Sunrise, Sunset" (Jerry Bock, Sheldon Harnick) - 2:20   
 "Maybe" (Richard Barrett) - 6:45   
 "Yellow Rose of Texas" (Don George) -2:20

Personnel 
Sonny Stitt - alto saxophone, tenor saxophone, varitone
Joe Newman, Clark Terry - trumpet, flugelhorn
Urbie Green, Dickie Harris - trombone
Jerry Dodgion, Hank Freeman - alto saxophone
Seldon Powell - tenor saxophone
George Berg - baritone saxophone
Ellis Larkins - piano 
Mike Mainieri - vibraphone
Les Spann - guitar
George Duvivier, Milt Hinton - bass 
Walter Perkins - drums

References 

1966 albums
Roulette Records albums
Sonny Stitt albums